The Construkction of Light (stylised as the construKction of light) is the twelfth studio album by English band King Crimson, released in May 2000 by record label Virgin. It is the first of two studio albums to feature the “double duo” line-up of Robert Fripp, Adrian Belew, Trey Gunn and Pat Mastelotto. It is the only King Crimson studio album to not chart in the US.

Recording and release 

By the release of the construKction of light, drummer Bill Bruford and bassist Tony Levin had left King Crimson. Their departure brought to an end the "double trio" era and marked Crimson’s return to a quartet formation. For the first time in the group’s history, Robert Fripp was the only remaining Englishman in the band.

Musically, the album bears a sound similar to their 1980s lineup, with Mastelotto primarily playing electronic drums and Belew, Gunn and Fripp often playing sophisticated, interlocking parts, with Belew and Fripp often utilizing overdriven guitar tones. However, the pace of these interlocking parts is often slower than in the '80s, with Belew and Fripp often trading single notes back and forth in hocket. As such, it presents a twist on the gamelan approach of the 1980s quartet.

The album also harks back to the 1970s, presenting sequels to instrumental pieces from this era. "Larks' Tongues in Aspic – Part IV" continues a series of pieces forming a cross-album suite, primarily recalling motifs from part II. "FraKctured" began as a fifth entry in the "Larks" suite, but was later considered closer in lineage to "Fracture", the final track from 1974's Starless and Bible Black, and thus renamed.

Fripp was unhappy with the album, considering that it "doesn't convey the power of the music, to a greater extent than any of the [King Crimson] studio albums", feeling it was hampered by the conditions under which it was made: none of the music was played live before it was recorded, Mastelotto not using his preferred hybrid acoustic/electronic kit, Fripp's attention being focused on writing/playing over recording/production. A "re-assembling" of the album with live recordings instead of the original studio recordings was an option explored by Discipline Global Mobile when it came to reissue the material.

In 2019, a substantial reworking of the album was released as The ReconstruKction of Light, when parts of the original recording were found to be lost. In particular, Pat Mastelotto re-recorded the drum parts for each song on a predominantly acoustic kit. The remix of "FraKctured" was released as part of the KC50 series online, serving as a preview of the full release. David Singleton's commentary on this track is underscored by the remix of "The World's My Oyster Soup Kitchen Floor Wax Museum".

Reception 

AllMusic wrote that the band "fall flat with The ConstruKction of Light [...] Unable to shed the weight of their oft-brilliant history, the most promising moments of ConstruKction are crushed underneath the bulk. What makes ConstruKction such a disappointment is, despite how 'progressive' the band-fragmenting ProjeKct approach appeared on paper, upon execution, it produced an utterly backward-looking album."

German prog magazine eclipsed, on the other hand, rated the album as the third best King Crimson album ever, and also included it in their list of the 150 best progressive rock albums of all time.

Regarding the revised 2019 version, The ReconstruKction of Light, Mark Smotroff of Audiophile Review noted that "The dynamics are much better and the music is not lying there flat. Mastelotto has arguably rescued this album by adding an impassioned new live drum track."

Track listing
All lyrics by Adrian Belew. All music by Belew, Robert Fripp, Trey Gunn and Pat Mastelotto.

Personnel
Robert Fripp – guitar, keyboards
Adrian Belew – guitar, vocals
Trey Gunn – Warr touch guitar, Ashbory bass
Pat Mastelotto – drums, percussion

Chart performance

References

External links
 
 Lyrics

King Crimson albums
2000 albums